The Chinese Ambassador to Jordan is the official representative of the People's Republic of China to the Hashemite Kingdom of Jordan.

List of representatives

References 

 
Jordan
China